Mussolinia is the former name of two planned communities in Italy which were named in honor of   the Italian fascist dictator Benito Mussolini

Mussolinia di Sicilia, the original name of Santo Pietro, a frazione in Caltagirone, Catania
Mussolinia di Sardegna, the original name of Arborea, a comune in the province of Oristano

See also
 Mussolini family